The 1976–77 AHL season was the 41st season of the American Hockey League. The league lost two teams, and divisions were dissolved. Six teams played 80 games each in the schedule. The F. G. "Teddy" Oke Trophy is awarded is for first place in the regular season, and the John D. Chick Trophy is not awarded. The Nova Scotia Voyageurs repeated as first overall in the regular season, and won their third Calder Cup championship.

Team changes
 The Richmond Robins cease operations.
 The Baltimore Clippers transfer to the Southern Hockey League.
 The Providence Reds are renamed the Rhode Island Reds.

Final standings
Note: GP = Games played; W = Wins; L = Losses; T = Ties; GF = Goals for; GA = Goals against; Pts = Points;

Scoring leaders

Note: GP = Games played; G = Goals; A = Assists; Pts = Points; PIM = Penalty minutes

 complete list

Calder Cup playoffs

Trophy and award winners
Team awards

Individual awards

Other awards

See also
List of AHL seasons

References
AHL official site
AHL Hall of Fame
HockeyDB

 
American Hockey League seasons
3
3